In enzymology, a L-arabinitol 2-dehydrogenase is an enzyme that catalyzes the chemical reaction

L-arabinitol + NAD+  L-ribulose + NADH + H+

Thus, the two substrates of this enzyme are L-arabinitol and NAD+, whereas its 3 products are L-ribulose, NADH, and H+.

This enzyme belongs to the family of oxidoreductases, specifically those acting on the CH-OH group of donor with NAD+ or NADP+ as acceptor. The systematic name of this enzyme class is L-arabinitol:NAD+ 2-oxidoreductase (L-ribulose-forming). Other names in common use include L-arabinitol dehydrogenase (ribulose-forming), and L-arabinitol (ribulose-forming) dehydrogenase. This enzyme participates in pentose and glucuronate interconversions.

References

 

EC 1.1.1
NADH-dependent enzymes
Enzymes of unknown structure